Cape Anguille is a headland and the westernmost point in Newfoundland, reaching into the Gulf of Saint Lawrence. It is the southern edge of St. George's Bay. Its name is derived from the French word anguille, which means eel. Close to the cape is the community of Cape Anguille.

The new lighthouse was established in Cape Anguille in 1960, replacing a predecessor from 1908. The new lighthouse is octagonal pyramidal in shape, 17.7 metres (58 feet) tall, and made of concrete.

Lighthouse keepers
 Alfred Patry 1908–1943
 J. Laurier Patry 1943–1983
 Henry Reid 1984–1991
 Leonard Patry 1991–present

See also
 List of lighthouses in Newfoundland and Labrador
 List of lighthouses in Canada
 Henri de Miffonis

References

External links
 Cape Anguille Light Keeper's Residence
 Aids to Navigation Canadian Coast Guard

Headlands of Newfoundland and Labrador